Manitou, akin to the Haudenosaunee orenda, is the spiritual and fundamental life force among Algonquian groups in the Native American theology. It is omnipresent and manifests everywhere: organisms, the environment, events, etc. Aashaa monetoo means "good spirit," while otshee monetoo means "bad spirit." When the world was created, the Great Spirit, Aasha Monetoo, gave the land to the indigenous peoples, the Shawnee in particular.

Overview
The term manitou was already in widespread use at the time of early European contact. In 1585, when Thomas Harriot recorded the first glossary of an Algonquian language, Roanoke (Pamlico), he included the word mantóac, meaning "gods" (plural). Similar terms are found in nearly all of the Algonquian languages.

In some Algonquian traditions, Gitche Manitou refers to a "great spirit" or supreme being. The term has analogues dating to before European contact, and the word uses of gitche and manitou themselves existed prior to contact. After contact, however, Gitche Manitou was adopted by some Anishinaabe Christian groups, such as the Ojibwe, to refer to God. 
Algonquian religion acknowledges medicine men, who used manitou to see the future, change the weather, and heal illness. Ojibwe medicine men were primarily healers who used their spiritual connection to cure patients, since illness was then believed to be caused by magic and spirits. To communicate with spirits and manipulate manitou, a healer would enter a trance, induced by singing, dancing, drum beats, or the use of hallucinogens. Non-healers could also interact with spirits by embarking upon a "vision quest," by means of prayer, fasting, hallucinogens, and/or removing themselves from the society of others. A person who underwent vision quests would be visited by an "animal, voice, or object," which would become their guardian spirit.

Place names

Manitou has made its way into the names of several places in North America.  The name of Lake Manitoba (for which the Canadian province of Manitoba is named) derives from the area called manitou-wapow, or "strait of the Manitou" in Cree or Ojibwe, referring to the strange sound of waves crashing against rocks near the Narrows of the lake. Manitoba is also home to Whiteshell Provincial Park's petroforms, symbols made from rocks, which serve as reminders of the instructions given to the Anishinaabe by the Creator. The Anishinaabe Midewiwin, or Grand Medicine Society, considers the area containing the petroforms to be Manito Ahbee, the place where the Creator sits. It is the site where the original Anishinaabe was lowered from the sky to the ground by the Creator.

Manitoulin Island, called mnidoo mnis, or "island of the Great Spirit," by the Odawa, is very important to the Ojibwe, or Anishinaabe, because of its many sacred sites and sounding rocks. Native peoples continue to dwell on the island, which is host to several reserves.

Sleeping Bear Dunes National Lakeshore, on Lake Michigan's eastern coastline in the state of Michigan, includes two sites known as North and South Manitou Islands.

See also

References

Anishinaabe mythology
First Nations culture
Deities and spirits
Energy (esotericism)
Vitalism
Spirituality